Li Dongye (1916 – 2 January 2011) was a major general (shaojiang) of the People's Liberation Army (PLA) who served as political commissioner of National University of Defense Technology from 1979 to 1983.

Biography
Li was born in Shenyang, Liaoning, in 1916. He joined the Chinese Communist Party (CCP) in 1937, and enlisted in the Eighth Route Army in the same year. During the Second Sino-Japanese War, he worked in the Central Party School of the Chinese Communist Party in Yan'an, Shaanxi. During the Chinese Civil War, he was deputy director of Political Department of Liaoning Military District.

After the establishment of the Communist State in 1949, he became director of Political Department of Dalian Naval School. He was promoted to the rank of major general (shaojiang) in 1964. He was political commissioner of National University of Defense Technology in February 1979, and held that office until December 1983. On 2 January 2011, he died from an illness in Shanghai, aged 95.

References

1916 births
2011 deaths
People from Shenyang
People's Liberation Army generals from Liaoning